Saltbush Bill is a humorous poem by Australian writer and poet Andrew Barton "Banjo" Paterson. It was first published in The Bulletin magazine on 15 December 1894, the Christmas issue of that publication.

Saltbush Bill was one of Paterson's best known characters who appeared in 5 poems: "Saltbush Bill" (1894),  "Saltbush Bill's Second Fight" (1897), "Saltbush Bill's Gamecock" (1898), "Saltbush Bill on the Patriarchs" (1903), and "Saltbush Bill, J.P." (1905).

Plot summary

The character is introduced in this poem as a drover of sheep along "the track of the Overland", who stretches "the law of the Great Stock Routes" by allowing his sheep to make use of all the good grass they find.  On the occasion described in the poem, Bill's sheep have spread across a squatter's property.  A Jackaroo arrives and attempts to drive the sheep back into the accepted "space of the half-mile track".  An argument and then fight ensues between Bill and the Jackaroo, and, while Bill concedes after a marathon fight, in the end he achieves his aim of finding his sheep a good feed.

Further publications

 The Man from Snowy River and Other Verses by Banjo Paterson (1895)
 Favourite Australian Poems edited by Ian Mudie (1963)
 The Penguin Book of Australian Verse edited by  Harry Payne Heseltine (1972)
 A Treasury of Colonial Poetry (1982) 
 Singer of the Bush, A. B. (Banjo) Paterson : Complete Works 1885-1900 edited by Rosamund Campbell and Philippa Harvie (1983)
 A Vision Splendid : The Complete Poetry of A. B. 'Banjo' Paterson (1990)
 A Treasury of Bush Verse edited by G. A. Wilkes (1991)
 The Penguin Book of Australian Ballads edited by Elizabeth Webby and Philip Butterss (1993)

See also
 1894 in poetry
 1894 in literature
 1894 in Australian literature
 Australian literature

References 

1894 poems
Poetry by Banjo Paterson
Works originally published in The Bulletin (Australian periodical)